John Gilbert (14 September 1930 – 14 September 1998) was a Canadian radio broadcaster.

Gilbert grew up in the Cabbagetown section of Toronto before running away from home to join a carnival when he was 13. He began his broadcasting career in Cornwall, Ontario at age 17 and hosted his first talk show in Saint John, New Brunswick around 1966.

Gilbert was a broadcaster with CJCH Halifax, which was acquired by CHUM Limited in 1970. In February 1971, Toronto's 1050 CHUM announced that he would succeed Larry Solway as host of the talk show Speak Your Mind. In 1973, he became the most successful radio talk show host in Canada with 120 000 measured listeners, more than Vancouver media legend Jack Webster. Gilbert's term with CHUM ended in 1977.

In 1980, Gilbert hosted Night Talk, a weekday late night program planned as a national talk show. However, the CRTC ordered that the network of stations broadcasting the program be cut back from 13 to the six stations then owned by Maclean-Hunter: CKEY Toronto (host station), CFCN Calgary, CFCO Chatham, CHNS Halifax, CKGL-FM Kitchener, and CKOY Ottawa. A year after it launched, it was also broadcast by CJJD Hamilton, CJBQ Belleville, CJNH Bancroft, CHSC St. Catharines, and CHEX Peterborough. The show ran until 1982, when Gilbert re-joined Night Talk co-creator Taylor Parnaby, who had become station manager of CKO.

Career
 years unknown: CKSF, Cornwall, Ontario
  1962: CHEX, Peterborough, Ontario
 years unknown: CFBC, Saint John, New Brunswick
 ???-1971: CJCH, Halifax
 1971-1977: CHUM, Toronto
 1978-1980: CKFH, Toronto
 1980-1982: CKEY Toronto
 1982-1986: CKO, Toronto (national radio network)
 1990s: CKTB, St. Catharines, Ontario

References

External links
 University of British Columbia: Public Affairs Office fonds - #3305 - references 1987 interviews with John Gilbert on CKO
 CBSC Decision CBSC Decision 92/93-0179: CKTB-AM re the John Gilbert Show 26 October 1993
 Vancouver Broadcasters list

1930 births
1998 deaths
Canadian radio personalities